H. D. Smith & Co.  was a tool manufacturing company based in Plantsville, Connecticut, founded by Henry D. Smith in 1850.

H.D. Smith & Co. hardware works was originally in Meriden, Connecticut began as a supplier to the carriage makers of New Haven, Connecticut. H.D. Smith later moved to Plantsville, Connecticut where the company originally used leased facilities until they were able to move into the H.D. Smith & Co. works.

H. D. Smith was one of the originators of the drop-forging process, and was described by The New York Times as being one of the pioneers of the carriage Hardware industry.

Around 1900 the company shifted production to bicycle parts and tool kits for automobiles.

See also
 List of defunct consumer brands

References

External links
May, 1893 Catalogue of the H.D. Smith & Co: carriage, wagon and sleigh forgings, Plantsville, CT
 H. D. Smith & Co. of Plantsville, Connecticut history at OldTools Archive 
Plantsville Historic District  
H. D. Smith & CO., Plantsville, CT Makers of the  “PERFECT HANDLE” line of tools By Bill Taggart;  The Tool Table. The Newsletter of the Richmond Antique Tool Society Volume 15, No. 1
H. D. Smith & Co. - Plantsville, CT at wkFineTools.com 

Defunct consumer brands
Tool manufacturing companies of the United States
Manufacturing companies based in Connecticut
Defunct companies based in Connecticut